Fearnoch is a small village in Argyll and Bute, Scotland.

Forest
The village lies at the northern edge of Fearnoch Forest, a woodland managed by Forestry Commission Scotland, which contains trails for walking, cycling, and horseback riding.

Transport
The West Highland Line railway service between Tyndrum and Oban stops at nearby , and buses between Tyndrum and Oban stop at Fearnoch. National Cycle Route 78 passes by the village.

References

Villages in Argyll and Bute